The 3rd South African Infantry Brigade was an infantry brigade of the army of the Union of South Africa during World War II.  The Brigade formed part of the South African 1st Infantry Division and was formed on 13 August 1940.  It  served in the Western Desert and was disbanded on 1 January 1943.

During the Western Desert Campaign (at the time of the Second Battle of El Alamein), the Officer Commanding was Brig. R.J. Palmer and the brigade comprised the following units:

3rd South African Infantry Brigade 
 1st Imperial Light Horse SA Infantry Corps
 1st Rand Light Infantry SA Infantry Corps
 1st Royal Durban Light Infantry SA Infantry Corps
 One Troop 3rd Light Anti-Aircraft Battery SA Artillery Corps
 2nd Field Company SA Engineering Corps

Citations

Bibliography
 Orpen, N. War in the Desert: South African Forces World War II: Volume III.  1971, Purnell, Cape Town.

Infantry brigades of South Africa in World War II
Military units and formations established in 1940
Military units and formations disestablished in 1943